Worcester Wanderers are an English rugby union team and part of the club known as Worcester Rugby Football Club. The club was born in 1871 and from it rose former Gallagher Premiership team Worcester Warriors. Worcester RFC based in the city of Worcester and play in Midlands 1 West, a level 6 league in the English rugby union system. They play their home matches on either the  Weston's Field pitches, very close to Sixways Stadium.

The club has a stong Mini & Junior programme, a very successful Senior Women's Team (League Champions 2021-22), a Men's and Women's Colts as well as a Men's & Women's Mixed Ability Team.

Club Honours
Midlands 4 West (South) champions: 2008-09
Midlands 3 West (South) champions: 2009-10
Midlands 1 (east v west) promotion playoff winners: 2012-13

References

External links
Official club website

English rugby union teams
Rugby clubs established in 1871
Sport in Worcester, England
Worcester Warriors